The Tayside Junior Football League, originally called the Midlands League, was a football league competition operated in Tayside under the Scottish Junior Football Association which operated as the top league in the territory from 1969 until a merger in 2002; it existed for a further four years as a second-tier league before the name was discontinued in 2006.

History
Junior football had been played in the region since the 1890s, but it was not until a restructuring across Scotland in the late 1960s that all teams in the territory were brought together under one umbrella - previously they had been competing in the local leagues in Angus, Perthshire and Dundee, though the membership of these was not always rigidly dependent on geography, and another Midland League also existed from the 1920s to the 1940s involving clubs from all three territories. Due to predicted difficulties in arranging the new format, an extra year was requested for its completion by the local committees, and the Midland (Tayside) leagues began in 1969, a year after the rest of Scotland (the North was the only other of the six new regions which required more than minor adjustment to its structure).

With titles having been shared between clubs from Perthshire and Dundee (the sole Angus champions in 1974 being Kirrie Thistle), the league's balance altered dramatically in 1990 when Tayport joined the setup; their base was actually in the far north of Fife but they were permitted to join the Tayside league as they were closer to many of its teams via the Tay Road Bridge. The Port almost immediately began to dominate and did not finish outside the top two places from 1991 until 2002, when the Tayside leagues were merged with the Fife League and the East (Lothians) league to form a new Scottish Junior Football Association, East Region Superleague. Despite the challenge of facing the strongest clubs from these other two areas, Tayport continued to be among the leading teams for the first six years; Dundee side Lochee United also finished as East Region champions twice in that period. Tayside's setup was retained as a feeder division to the Superleague along with the other historic districts until 2006, when they were fully integrated into the East Region; Tayside's section (minus the Perthshire teams which were placed with the Fife sides) became the North Division below the Super League and a new Premier Division.

In 2018, a large group of East Junior clubs joined the East of Scotland Football League, aspiring to gain entry to the senior Scottish Professional Football League in future years; however, on Tayside the only ones to do so were the Perth teams Jeanfield Swifts and Kinnoull. This led to a North-South reorganisation of the remaining members of the region, with the 2019–20 Superleague North composed entirely of former Tayside clubs.

Champions

Notes

List of winners

Notes

References

Non-League Scotland (archive version), with club progression by season 1990 to 2007)
 Scottish Junior FA Structure, Scottish Junior Football Association

1969 establishments in Scotland
2002 disestablishments in Scotland
Sports leagues established in 1969
Sports leagues disestablished in 2002
Defunct Scottish Junior Football Association leagues
Football in Dundee
Football in Angus, Scotland
Football in Perth and Kinross
Scottish Junior Football Association, East Region
Defunct football leagues in Scotland